Contessi is an Italian surname. Notable people with the surname include:

Luigi Contessi (1894–1967), Italian gymnast
Pablo Contessi (died 2016), Paraguayan doctor and politician

Italian-language surnames